Rasmus Olai Mortensen (23 August 1869 – 30 July 1934) was the Norwegian Minister of Provisioning 1921–1922, as well as head of the Ministry of Social Affairs in 1922, then Minister of Social Affairs 1922–1923 in Blehr's Second Cabinet.

1869 births
1934 deaths
Government ministers of Norway